"Work It Out" is a 1996 song by the English hard rock band Def Leppard from their gold album Slang. It was written entirely by new guitarist Vivian Campbell. It was released as a single later that year, reaching number six on the US Mainstream Rock chart and number 22 on the UK Singles Chart.

Background
Lead singer Joe Elliot said in the album's commentary that Work It Out "was Vivian [Campbell's] first songwriting contribution to the band" and that Elliot "had this opportunity to channel [his] inner Iggy Pop instead of screeching in this high register like [he had] always done in the past".
The music video was directed by Nigel Dick in April 1996 at Occidental Studios in Los Angeles, California. The video was released in May 1996.

"Work It Out" has not been played live by the band since the Slang World Tour in 1997.

Track listing
CD Bludgeon Riffola - Mercury/LEPDD16 (UK)/578 271-2 (INT)
This single contains collector's postcards of classic Def Leppard album covers. It contains the On Through the Night, High 'n' Dry, Pyromania and Hysteria postcards, with band members comments on the back.
 "Work It Out"
 "Work It Out" (original demo version)
 "Truth?" (original demo Version)

CD Bludgeon Riffola - Mercury/LEPCD16 (UK)/578 270-2 (INT)
 "Work It Out"
 "Move With Me Slowly"
 "Two Steps Behind" (live acoustic version)

CD Bludgeon Riffola - Mercury/LC0268 (UK)/578 293-2 (INT)
 "Work It Out"
 "Move With Me Slowly"
 "Work It out" (original demo)
 "Truth?" (original version)

Charts

Weekly charts

Year-end charts

Notes

Def Leppard songs
1996 singles
Music videos directed by Nigel Dick
Songs written by Vivian Campbell
1996 songs
Mercury Records singles